Galadari Printing and Publishing is a media company based in Dubai, UAE. It publishes the English-language newspaper Khaleej Times and is owned by the conglomerate Galadari Brothers,  Suhail Galadari and Brothers.

References

External links 
Khaleej Times newspaper

Mass media in the United Arab Emirates
Mass media in Dubai
Publishing companies of the United Arab Emirates